Route 352, also known as Fortune Harbour Road, is a  north-south highway on the northern coast of Newfoundland in the Canadian province of Newfoundland and Labrador. It connects the town of Northern Arm, at an intersection with Route 350 (Botwood Highway), with the community of Fortune Bay, along with several other communities in between.

Route description

Route 352 begins in Northern Arm at an intersection with Route 350 (Botwood Highway). It heads northeast through neighbourhoods to leave town and pass along the coastline of the Bay of Exploits to pass through Philips Head, Point of Bay, and Charles Brook. The highway now winds its way northward up a peninsula for several kilometres to pass Cottrell's Cove, where it has an intersection with a local road leading to Moore's Cove. Route 352 winds its way through more rural terrain to enter Fortune Harbour, where it comes to a dead end after passing through the town.

Major intersections

References

352